The Type 201 was Germany's first U-boat class built after World War II.

Design 

They were built out of amagnetic steel to counter the threat of magnetic naval mines, but the material had been insufficiently tested and proved to be problematic in service with the Bundesmarine. Microscopic cracks in the pressure hull forced the cancellation of nine of the twelve ordered submarines and the rebuilding of the first two boats as Type 205 submarines. Responsible for the design and construction was the Ingenieurkontor Lübeck (IKL) headed by Ulrich Gabler.

List of boats

U-3 was loaned to the Royal Norwegian Navy and served under the name Kobben from 1962 to 1964 before being commissioned in the German Navy.

References
 
 Taucher.net (in German)